Upali Air was a Sri Lankan airline. It was the island's first domestic airline.

History
Upali Air was founded at the end of the 1960s by Sri Lankan entrepreneur Upali Wijewardene. This businessman was well known for his skill in buying companies on the brink of bankruptcy and making them successful. 

Upali Air began operating with a single 20-seat De Havilland Canada DHC-6 Twin Otter airplane.  Later other small airplanes were added to its fleet.

This company ceased to exist not long after Wijewardene's death in an plane crash in February 1983. The Learjet 35A, in which Wijewardene crashed, was registered to the airline. Although other companies of the Upali group continued operating after the founder's death, the Sri Lankan Civil War between the LTTE and the government finished the airline. The increased controls and security measures, along with converting civilian airfields such as Ratmalana Airport into military bases for the Sri Lankan Air Force made Upali Air's operation no longer viable.

Routes

Fleet

Accidents and incidents
On 13 February 1983, a Learjet 35A took off from Kuala Lumpur at 8:41 pm, bound for Colombo. On board was Wijewardene, his Malaysian lawyer S.M. Ratnam, Upali Group Director Ananda Peli Muhandiram, pilot Capt. Noel Anandappa, co-pilot Sydney Soysa, and steward S. Senenakye. Fifteen minutes after takeoff, the aircraft disappeared while flying over the Strait of Malacca. Search operations by air and naval units of Sri Lanka, India, the United States, the Soviet Union, Australia, Indonesia, and Malaysia failed to locate evidence of a crash.

References

External links 

Defunct airlines of Sri Lanka